Krasova may refer to:

People
Kateryna Krasova, Ukrainian road cyclist
Marta Krásová (1901–1970), Czech opera singer
Vera Krasova (born 1987), Russian model
Vladimíra Krásová, Czech bodybuilder

Places
Krasová, a municipality and village in the South Moravian Region, Czech Republic